Silvano Tranquilli (23 August 1925 – 10 May 1997) was an Italian stage, television and film actor.

Life and career
Born in Rome, Silvano Tranquilli attended theatre lessons at the Sharoff Academy, and started his stage activity with the theatrical companies of Salvo Randone and Vittorio Gassman.  In 1959 he made his television debut, and later acted in more than 100 television productions, achieving his main success with the TV-series I ragazzi di padre Tobia. In the early 1960s he also started a prolific film career as character actor.

He died in Rome, at 71, shortly after his theatrical comeback with the company Stabile del Giallo.

Selected filmography 

 Adriana Lecouvreur (1955)
 Il conte Aquila (1955)
 Napoli sole mio! (1958) - Segretario del Impresario
 Perfide ma... belle (1959) - The Telephone Technician (uncredited)
 I piaceri del sabato notte (1960) - Il vice commissario
 The Horrible Dr. Hichcock (1962) - Dr. Kurt Lowe 
 Castle of Blood (1964, aka Danse Macabre) - Edgar Allan Poe
 I due sanculotti (1966) - Robespierre
 Shoot Loud, Louder... I Don't Understand (1966) - Il tenente Bertolucci
 The Invisible Woman (1969) - Andrea
 Help Me, My Love (1969) - Valerio Mantovani
 Senza sapere niente di lei (1969) - L'ing. Zappengo
 Lonely Hearts (1970) - Diego
 Sunflower (1970) - L'operaio italiano
 Mafia Connection (1970) - Commissario Modica
 Quella chiara notte d'ottobre (1970)
 L'Explosion (1971) - Aubrey
 Black Belly of the Tarantula (1971) - Paolo Zani
 Web of the Spider (1971) - William Perkins
 The Double (1971) - Roger
 The Bloodstained Butterfly (1971) - Inspector Berardi
 Sei iellato, amico hai incontrato Sacramento (1972) - Doc O'Donnell
 Smile Before Death (1972, a.k.a. Smile of the Hyena) - Marco
 So Sweet, So Dead (1972) - Paolo Santangeli
 Il mio corpo con rabbia (1972)
 La gatta in calore (1972) - Antonio
 Mia moglie, un corpo per l'amore (1973) - Paolo
 Giorni d'amore sul filo di una lama (1973)
 La bonne année (1973) - L'amant italien
 High Crime (1973) - Franco Griva
 The Violent Professionals (1973) - Gianni Viviani
 Tony Arzenta - Big Guns (1973) - Montani - the Interpol officer
 Ceremonia sangrienta (1973) - Médico
 Mean Frank and Crazy Tony (1973) - Sylvester
 Tecnica di un amore (1973) - Andrea
 Diario di un italiano (1973) - Alberto
 And Now My Love (1974)
 Madeleine... anatomia di un incubo (1974) - Dr. Shuman
 The Balloon Vendor (1974) - Dr. Novelli
 Das Blaue Palais (1974–1976, TV series) - Louis Palm
 Manhunt in the City (1975) - Paolo Giordani
 Down the Ancient Staircase (1975) - Professor Rospigliosi
 Violent Rome (1975) - Capo della Squadra mobile
 Syndicate Sadists (1975) - Dr. Marco Marsili
 So Young, So Lovely, So Vicious... (1975) - Doctor Batrucchi
 Lips of Lurid Blue (1975) - Davide Levi
  (1976)
 Violent Naples (1976) - Paolo Gervasi
 La bravata (1977)
 L'affaire Suisse (1978) - Zurlini
 Star Odyssey (1979, a.k.a. Seven Gold Men in Space)
 The Finzi Detective Agency (1979) - Augusto Moser
 The Pumaman (1980) - Ambassador Dobson
 Tranquille donne di campagna (1980)
 L'ultimo giorno (1985) - Carlo Salvi
 Don Bosco (1988) 
 Odore di spigo (1990)

References

External links 
 

1925 births
1997 deaths
Male actors from Rome
Italian male stage actors
Italian male television actors
Italian male film actors
People of Lazian descent
20th-century Italian male actors